Fareeda "Kokikhel" Afridi was a Pashtun feminist, a women's rights activist in Pakistan. In July 2012, at the age of 25, she was shot dead on her way to work.

Afridi was born and raised in the Khyber tribal area, part of the Federally Administered Tribal Areas (FATA), an impoverished semi-autonomous region in Pakistan's northwest, bordering Afghanistan.

She graduated from university with a master's degree in gender studies. While still in school, with her sister Noor Zia Afridi, she founded the Society for Appraisal and Women Empowerment in Rural Areas (SAWERA), a women-run NGO promoting women's empowerment in FATA.

Afridi was critical of the Pakistani government, the Taliban, and the patriarchal nature of Pakistani society.

In June 2012, she told journalists she was being threatened. Her friends and colleagues suspected the threats originated with FATA Taliban militants.

On 5 July 2012, as Afridi left her home to go to work in Hayatabad a suburb of Peshawar, she was shot once in the head and twice in the neck by two motorcyclists, who afterwards escaped. She died in hospital.

Condemning the murder at a protest camp organized by the Aurat Foundation along with Peshawar Press Club and Pakistan Federal Union of Journalists, Khyber Pakhtunkhwa's Information Minister Mian Iftikhar Hussain stated:

She was the second female in Khyber Pakhtunkhwa to be targeted by Taliban extremists.

See also
List of Muslim feminists
List of unsolved murders
Women in Pakistan

References

Pakistani women's rights activists
Pashtun women
2012 deaths
People from Khyber District
Pakistani feminists
Terrorism deaths in Pakistan
Pakistani terrorism victims
People of the insurgency in Khyber Pakhtunkhwa
People killed by the Tehrik-i-Taliban Pakistan
Year of birth missing
Violence against women in Pakistan
Assassinated Pakistani activists
Incidents of violence against women
Deaths by firearm in Khyber Pakhtunkhwa